Baandee is a small town located in the Wheatbelt region of Western Australia, about halfway between the towns of Kellerberrin and Merredin on the Great Eastern Highway, approximately  from Perth, the state capital.

History
The town was gazetted in April 1912. There is some debate as to the Aboriginal meaning of the name, although one settler noted that the Aboriginal name for Hines Hill,  to the east, is "Baandui".

In 1932, the Wheat Pool of Western Australia announced that the town would have two wheat elevators on two new wheat bins, each fitted with an engine, installed at the railway siding. The installation of at least one elevator was completed early the following year.

References

Towns in Western Australia
Wheatbelt (Western Australia)